Hilarographa marangana is a species of moth of the family Tortricidae. It is found on Sumatra.

The wingspan is about 15 mm.

References

Moths described in 2009
Hilarographini